Michael A. Cardozo (born June 28, 1941) is an American lawyer.  From 2002 through the end of 2013, he was the Corporation Counsel for the Government of New York City, New York (a position appointed by the mayor).   Cardozo is a partner at the law firm Proskauer Rose, and a former president of the New York City Bar Association. His great grandfather's first cousin was United States Supreme Court Justice Benjamin Cardozo.

Early life and education

Michael A. Cardozo was born on June 28, 1941 in New York City to Lucile and Harmon Cardozo.  He received his Bachelor of Arts degree in 1963 from Brown University, located in Providence, Rhode Island, and his Juris Doctor degree in 1966 from Columbia Law School, located in New York City. After graduation, Cardozo served as a law clerk to Judge Edward C. McLean in the United States District Court for the Southern District of New York.

Career
In 1967, he joined the law firm of Proskauer Rose and became a member of the Litigation Department.  He became a partner in 1974 and served in that capacity until 2002 when he was appointed Corporation Counsel of New York City.  While at Proskauer Cardozo was co-head of its Sports Law Practice and represented, among other clients, the National Basketball Association, the National Hockey League and Major League Soccer.  Cardozo was elected three times to the firm's executive committee, and co-chaired its litigation department from 1987 to 1991.

In January 2002, Mayor Michael Bloomberg appointed him the City's 77th Corporation Counsel, the City's chief legal officer.  In that capacity he served as head of the City's 700 lawyer Law Department and as legal counsel to Mayor Bloomberg, elected officials, the City and all its agencies. He held that role for 12 years for the full 3-term tenure of the Mayor, the longest anyone has served in that capacity since the Office was created in the mid-19th century.  During Cardozo's tenure the City's payout of settlement and judgments declined by 14 percent.  Cardozo advised on scores of significant litigations, handling some of them himself. Under his direction, the Law Department brought successful suits concerning the illegal use of guns and the improper sale of cigarettes, and defended a major class action discrimination suit against the Fire Department, numerous challenges to the health care initiatives of Mayor Bloomberg, and steps taken in connection with the Occupy Wall Street and Republican National Convention demonstrations. Among the cases Cardozo personally successfully argued was a real estate tax dispute with the government of India in the U.S. Supreme Court, and a $2.5 billion bond case in the New York Court of Appeals.

In 2014, Cardozo returned to Proskauer where he was a senior litigation partner handling commercial litigations of all types and suits against New York City, New Jersey and Florida.  He also successfully represented long time felon Judith Clark, the  get-a-way driver in the infamous Brinks robbery, in seeking parole after having served 39 years in prison.  He retired from Proskauer at the end of October 2022.  In September of 2022 New Y ork Governor Kathy Hochul appointed Cardozo to the New York State Commission on Ethics and Lobbying in Government.

Civic involvement
Long active in civic affairs Cardozo presently serves as a member of the Board of Citizens' Union, chair of the New York Court Simplfication Task Force,  and is a member of the Advisory Board of Legal Outreach. He was president of the New York City Bar Association from 1996 to 1998. He also previously served as Chair of the Columbia Law School Board of Visitors and the Fund for Modern Courts, a non-partisan citizen organization devoted to improving New York State courts.  He also previously chaired  the New York State Commission on Legislative, Judicial and Executive Compensation and two court-system task forces appointed by New York Governor Mario Cuomo and Chief Judge of the New York Court of Appeals Sol Wachtler.

Among the honors Cardozo has received are: the American Lawyer Lifetime Achievement Award, the Citizens Union Public Service Award, the New York Urban League Frederick Douglas Medallion for Leadership and Service, the Federal Bar Council’s Emory Buckner Award for Outstanding Public Service, the Columbia Law School Lawrence Wien Prize for Social Responsibility, the Anti-Defamation League's Human Relations Award, the Fund for Modern Courts' Cyrus R. Vance Tribute for Dedicated Work Towards Judicial Reform, the George A. Katz Torch of Learning Award from American Friends of Hebrew University; the New York Law Journal’s Impact Award and The Fund for Modern Courts Career Public Service Award.

Personal life
He married the former Nancy Caryn Cogut in Roslyn, New York on June 20, 1965.  They have two children.

See also

 List of Brown University people
 List of Columbia Law School alumni
 List of people from New York City

References
Notes

Sources
 Chen, David W. (December 17, 2009).  "From State Judges, a Rebuke of Top Bloomberg Adviser".  The New York Times.  Retrieved February 13, 2012.
Proskauer Rose web site.

External links
 "About the Law Department", official portal of the New York City Law Department on nyc.gov, the city's official website

Place of birth missing (living people)
Brown University alumni
Columbia Law School alumni
Government lawyers
Living people
1941 births
New York (state) lawyers
New York City public officials
Lawyers from New York City
Presidents of the New York City Bar Association
Proskauer Rose partners